The Convention of Chinese-Filipino Southern Baptist Churches was formally established on January 21, 1957, though they were technically in existence since 1950. It began in November 30, 1948, as Philippine Chinese Baptist Convention, when Southern Baptist missionaries in Shanghai, China were forced to relocate to the Philippines due to the civil unrest caused by the Chinese Revolution (1946−1952).  The missionaries settled in Baguio where they started their work in converting the local Chinese there before eventually establishing churches in Dagupan, Manila and Davao City in 1952.  The PCBC also established the Philippine Baptist Theological Seminary in Baguio on July 15, 1952. Eventually, PCBC was renamed to Convention of Chinese-Filipino Southern Baptist Churches (CCF-SBC).

Member Churches
As of April 2013, the CCF-SBC has the following member churches:
Baguio Chinese Baptist Church
Manila Chinese Baptist Church
Davao Chinese Baptist Church
La Union Chinese Baptist Church
Dagupan Chinese Baptist Church
La Trinidad Benguet International Baptist Church
Caloocan Christian Baptist Church
Tarlac Living Faith Christian Baptist Church

Summer Camps
The CCF-SBC has annual camps held during the Holy Week from Monday-Saturday for the Youth and the Children's Camp. The Adult Camp holds its camp on Thursday to Saturday of the Holy Week. The Youth and Children's Camp are usually held at the Philippine Baptist Theological Seminary in Baguio.

External links
 Philippine Chinese Baptist Convention - Official Facebook Page

Chinese-Filipino culture
Baptist Christianity in the Philippines
Christian organizations established in 1957
Baptist denominations established in the 20th century
Evangelical denominations in Asia